Mathias Bourgue was the defending champion but lost in the second round to Constant Lestienne.

Maximilian Marterer won the title after defeating Lestienne 6–4, 7–5 in the final.

Seeds

Draw

Finals

Top half

Bottom half

References
Main Draw
Qualifying Draw

Challenger La Manche - Singles
2018 Singles